Dar-Naim  is a suburb of Nouakchott and urban commune in western Mauritania. It is the capital of Nouakchott-Nord Region and has a population of 61,089.

References

See also
Dar Naim Prison

Communes of Mauritania
Nouakchott
Regional capitals in Mauritania